is a passenger railway station located in the city of Chichibu, Saitama, Japan, operated by the private railway operator Seibu Railway.

Lines

Some Seibu trains continue to Mitsumineguchi Station on the Chichibu Main Line of Chichibu Railway via a crossover between the two lines. Some Seibu trains also run to Nagatoro Station in the opposite direction of the Chichibu Main Line, however those trains do not stop at Seibu-Chichibu Station due to the layout of the crossover track.

Ohanabatake Station on the Chichibu Railway Chichibu Main Line is within walking distance from this station.

Station layout
The station consists of one island platform and one side platform serving three tracks. The side platform is adjacent to the station building, which is connected to the island platform by a footbridge.

Platforms

History
The station opened on 14 October 1969.

Station numbering was introduced on all Seibu Railway lines during fiscal 2012, with Seibu-Chichibu Station becoming "SI36".

Passenger statistics
In fiscal 2018, the station was used by an average of 7229 passengers daily.

The passenger figures for previous years are as shown below.

Surrounding area
 Ohanabatake Station (Chichibu Main Line)
 Chichibu City Office
 Chichibu Municipal Library
 Chichibu Tax Office
 Chichibu Shrine
 Hitsujiyama Park

References

External links

 
 SEIBU Railway Co.,LTD. All rights reserved.

Railway stations in Japan opened in 1969
Railway stations in Saitama Prefecture
Seibu Chichibu Line
Stations of Seibu Railway
Chichibu, Saitama